Leo Suryadinata (born Liauw Kian-Djoe  [or Liao Jianyu; 廖建裕] in Jakarta, 21 February 1941), is a Singaporean sinologist.

Early life
Suryadinata was born Liauw Kian-Djoe (also written Liao Jianyu) in Batavia, Netherlands Indies (today Jakarta, Indonesia) to a Chinese Indonesian family. His father was the owner of a building material factory. He had seven siblings.

During high school, Suryadinata read and wrote numerous papers on Indonesian and Chinese history and literature.

Education
Suryadinata later attended Nanyang University in Singapore, focusing on Chinese and South-East Asian literature. He graduated in 1962 with a bachelour's degree in arts.

From 1962 to 1965, Suryadinata studied literature at the University of Indonesia in Jakarta, receiving another bachelour's degree from that institution. He focused on Chinese literature, but began to show interest in the ethnic Chinese in Indonesia. His thesis discussed the late 19th century Peranakan Chinese press and early 20th century resistance movements against the Dutch colonial government.

In 1970, Suryadinata received a master's degree in history from Monash University in Australia. Two years later, he graduated from the University of Ohio in the United States with a master's degree in politics. He later received his doctorate from the American University in Washington, D.C.

Career
After earning his doctorate, Suryadinata returned to Singapore and took a research position at the Institute of South East Asian Studies (ISEAS) from 1976 to 1982. In 1982, he took a job as senior lecturer at Department of Political Science of the National University of Singapore; he later became an assistant professor in 1994 and a full professor in 2000.

From 1990, Suryadinata has served as the editor of the academic journal Asian Culture. He also served as editor (later co-editor) the Asian Journal of Political Science from 1993 to 2002.

In 2002, Suryadinata returned to ISEAS as a senior research fellow; he left in 2005. That year, he took a position as the director of the Chinese Heritage Center at Nanyang Technological University.

Publications
, Suryadinata has published 50 books and monographs, 30 chapters in peer reviewed books, 15 articles in international journals, 11 articles in Indonesian journals, six working papers and more than 100 conference papers. They have been published in English, Indonesian, and Chinese. Aimee Dawis of The Jakarta Post writes that "anyone studying the ethnic Chinese in Indonesia is bound to encounter Leo Suryadinata's works."

Awards
In 2008, Suryadinata (together with German researcher Mary F. Somers) received the Nabil Award for contributions to Indonesian ethnic integration.

Personal life
Suryadinata has one daughter.

References

Living people
Indonesian sinologists
People from Jakarta
Year of birth uncertain
Indonesian people of Chinese descent
University of Indonesia alumni
Monash University alumni
Nanyang University alumni
Ohio University alumni
American University alumni
Indonesian academics
1941 births
Academic staff of the National University of Singapore